James Frempong (born 11 January 1989) is a Swedish former professional footballer of Ghanaian descent who played as a midfielder.

Career
In 2008, Frempong was loaned to Superettan side IF Brommapojkarna, with which he promoted.

On the 26 August 2009, it was announced that Frempong will be on trial with Watford, as his contract with Örebro SK ended in November 2009.

On 27 October 2010, it emerged Celtic had watched Frempong in action for Gefle IF in a match against GAIS. Frempong was quoted afterwards as being "excited" at the Scottish club's interest.

On 9 August 2011 it was announced that he will join IFK Norrköping on a 3.5 year deal.

References

External links
James Frempong player info at the official Örebro SK website 
 

1989 births
Living people
Swedish footballers
Association football wingers
Örebro SK players
Gefle IF players
IF Brommapojkarna players
IFK Norrköping players
Swedish people of Ghanaian descent